The  Insurance Exchange Building, formerly known as the Middough Building and the Middough Brothers Building, is a registered historic building located on Broadway in downtown Long Beach, California, USA.  The eight-story Beaux Arts building was one of the largest office buildings in downtown Long Beach when it opened in 1925.  The building was added to the National Register of Historic Places in 2003.

Description and history
The Insurance Exchange Building was known as the Middough Building when it opened in 1925.  The eight-story office building was built by Lorne and Way Middough who moved their men's and boy's clothing store into the first floor.

The newly formed Long Beach Municipal Court was one of the building's original tenants, moving into the third, fifth and sixth floors in July 1925.  The court remained in the building for five years until additional space was needed for other courts and county offices.

In 1931, the Middough brothers sold the building, and its name was changed to the Insurance Exchange Building.

With  of floor space, the building was one of the largest office structures in downtown Long Beach.  In 1958, the building was sold, and the new owners announced plans to remodel and modernize the building and to establish a "de luxe restaurant" on the top floor.  At the time of the sale in 1958, stockbrokers, Dean Witter & Co., occupied the ground floor, and other major tenants included Household Finance Co. and Veloz and Yolanda dance studio.

In 1962, the building was sold again at a reported purchase price of $750,000.  The new owner, Don Roberts Co. Inc. of Beverly Hills, announced plans to turn the building into a center for insurance companies and their representatives.

In February 2003, the building was added to the National Register of Historic Places.  In 2007, the building was one of the first upgrade projects to be completed as part of The Promenade redevelopment of the downtown area. The upgrade project included a nightclub and Jamaican  restaurant.

See also
 List of City of Long Beach Historic Landmarks
 National Register of Historic Places listings in Los Angeles County, California

References

Commercial buildings on the National Register of Historic Places in California
Buildings and structures in Long Beach, California
Downtown Long Beach
Landmarks in Long Beach, California
Buildings and structures on the National Register of Historic Places in Los Angeles County, California